Wilhelm Kunst (2 February 1799 in Hamburg - 16 or 17 November 1859 in Vienna) was a German actor. He provoked varied reactions. He played heroic roles, roles that required subtlety and excellence in acting produced varied reactions. He did better in lower-rated versions of a particular plot, for example lesser translations of Shakespeare. In the plays he excelled at, for example Otto von Wittelsbach, he was stunned audiences. He first played major roles in Lübeck and worked his way up to the Viennese stage. During his heyday, he did well economically, but ended his career in poverty. In 1825, he married actress Sophie Schröder.

Sources 

Carl Schurz, Lebenserinnerungen bis zum Jahre 1852, Berlin: Georg Reimer, 1906 and 1911.  As a student in a gymnasium in Cologne (Chapter 3), Schurz was in the care of a locksmith who took him to plays occasionally. Schurz writes: “The taste of my friend the locksmith ran to knight dramas, and in his eyes there was no greater actor than Wilhelm Kunst who occasionally played guest roles in Cologne. Kunst belonged to that class of muscular actors — a giant of a figure gifted with a powerful body and the voice of a lion. But this voice was capable of more beautiful modulations, and he used his abilities with so much moderation and judgment that, as I believe, he had the reputation of a not insignificant, even a very noteworthy, player. The first piece I saw at the side of my locksmith was Otto von Wittelsbach, at that time a famous knight play in which the hero meets King Philipp of Swabia, who cheats him in a chess game. With an armored fist, the hero strikes the chess board so the pieces fly over the stage, and then strikes the king down with a blow from his sword. Here Kunst was in his element, and his achievement inspired me to the utmost. I also saw him as Wetter vom Strahl in Käthchen von Heilbronn and as Wallenstein in Wallensteins Tod.”

Notes 

1799 births
1859 deaths
German male stage actors
19th-century German male actors
Male actors from Hamburg